Jacopo da Forlì (also known as Giacomo dalla Torre, Jacopo della Torre, Iacobus Foroliviensis, or Giacomo da Forli;  – 1414) was a 14th-century Italian physician and philosopher.

Life 

Jacopo is known particularly for his studies of embryology. He became a professor at the University of Padua in the early 15th century, where he taught Vittorino da Feltre. His death is documented in the Malatestiana Library (in Latin):Explicit questio de intensione et remissione formarum secundum famosissimum artium et medicine doctorem magistrum Jacobum de Forlivio qui 1414 pridie ydus februarii ab hac vita ad superiora migravit. Scripta vero per me fratrem Bellinum de Padua 1468.It describes that Jacopo died in February 1414.

References 

1364 births
1414 deaths
14th-century Italian physicians
Italian philosophers